The Mülheim/Oberhausen tramway network is a network of tramways forming part of the public transport system focused on Mülheim an der Ruhr and Oberhausen, two cities in the federal state of North Rhine-Westphalia, Germany.

Lines 
, the network had the following lines:

The former line 110 (Styrum, Friesenstr. – Hauptfriedhof) was replaced by bus line 128 on October 4, 2015.

See also
List of town tramway systems in Germany
Trams in Germany

References

External links
 
 
 Ruhrbahn – official site 
 STOAG – official site 
 
 
 
 

Mülheim
Oberhausen
Mulheim Oberhausen
Transport in North Rhine-Westphalia
Metre gauge railways in Germany
750 V DC railway electrification
Mulheim